= Mini Skirt (group) =

Australian alternative rock group

- Origin: Byron Bay, New South Wales, Australia
- Genres: punk music
- Years active: 2017–present
- Members: Jacob Boylan; Cam Campbell; Jesse Pumphrey; Jacob Pumphrey

Mini Skirt are an Australian punk music group from Byron Bay, formed in 2016 and consisting of Jacob Boylan (vocals), Cam Campbell (guitar), Jesse Pumphrey (bass) and Jacob Pumphrey (drums).

Mini Skirt released All That We Know in November 2025, which peaked at number 36 on the ARIA Albums Chart.

== History ==
=== 2016–present: Formation and All That We Know ===
In 2020 the group released their debut album Casino.

In November 2025, the group released All That We Know which peaked at number 36 on the ARIA Albums Chart.

== Members ==
- Jacob Boylan – vocals
- Cam Campbell – guitar
- Jesse Pumphrey – bass
- Jacob Pumphrey – drums

== Discography ==
=== Albums ===
List of studio albums, with selected details
Title	Album details	Peak chart positions
Title	Album details	AUS
Casino	Released: 13 July 2020; Label: Mini Skirt	—
All That We Know	Released: 14 November 2025; Label: Bad Vibration (BADVIBES17D)	36

=== Extended plays ===
List of EPs, with selected details
Title	EP details
Taste	Released: December 2016; Label: Mini Skirt
7	Released: March 2018; Label: Mini Skirt
